Blankenberge is a Russian shoegaze band from Barnaul, Siberia, and currently based in Saint Petersburg, featuring dream pop and post-rock elements in their music composition.

History

Origins 
Blankenberge was formed in Barnaul, Siberia in 2015 by Yana Guselnikova (vocals) and Daniil Levshin (guitar, synth) after a trip throughout Europe. The band's name was chosen after the city Blankenberge in Belgium, which they visited on their trips. Yana and Daniil began to compose songs with their friends in Barnaul which would be part of their debut EP. They moved to Saint Petersburg and met members Daian Aiziatov (guitar), Dmitriy Marakov (bass) and Sergey Vorontsov (drums) to complete the lineup, though they knew each other before (except Sergey).

Career 
The band released their self-titled EP Blankenberge on March 12, 2016. Later that year, they released their first single "Pictures of You" in August, a The Cure's cover. On June 30, 2017, Blankenberge released their debut studio album Radiogaze along with the single "We". They signed to record label Elusive Sound in July of that same year. They released their second studio album More on April 10, 2019, accompanied with the single "Right Now". Their third studio album Everything was released on November 14, 2021, with their fourth single "No Sense", becoming the first album without band member Daian.

Members

Current members 
 Yana Guselnikova - vocals (2015–present)
 Daniil Levshin - guitar, synth (2015–present)
 Dmitriy Marakov - bass (2015–present)
 Sergey Vorontsov - drums (2015–present)

Past members 

 Daian Aiziatov - guitar (2015–2019)

Discography

Studio albums 

 Radiogaze (2017)
 More (2019)
 Everything (2021)

EPs 

 Blankenberge (2016)

Singles 

 "Pictures of You" (2016)
 "We" (2017)
 "Right Now" (2019)
 "No Sense" (2021)

See also 

 Pinkshinyultrablast

References 

Russian musical groups
Shoegazing musical groups
Post-rock groups
Dream pop musical groups